Foodie Love is a Spanish romance television series also heavily delving into gastronomy. Directed and created by Isabel Coixet, it stars Laia Costa and Guillermo Pfening. It was originally released on HBO España on 4 December 2019.

Premise 
The plot follows a couple who, after meeting through a dating app for food lovers, embark into a gastronomic and romantic story.

Cast 
Starring
 Laia Costa as "Ella".
  as "Él".
Other and cameos
 Yolanda Ramos
 Tony Thornburg
 Agnès Jaoui
 Natalia de Molina
 Greta Fernández
 .
 Luciana Littizzetto
 Nausicaa Bonnín
 Marina Campos
 Ferran Adrià

Production and release 
Notably featuring the style of Isabel Coixet's previous film works, Coixet wrote and directed the series. Produced by Miss Wasabi Films for HBO, the series was the HBO's first venturing into the production of local fiction in Spain. Shooting locations included Barcelona, Rome and Southern France (Montolieu). It consists of 8 episodes featuring a running time of around 35 minutes. The first three episodes were pre-screened at Cine Callao in Madrid on 20 November 2019. The full series was released on 4 December 2019 on HBO España. Coixet was reportedly interested in returning for a second season.

Awards and nominations 

|-
| align = "center" rowspan = "2" | 2020 || rowspan = "2" | 7th Feroz Awards || colspan = "2" | Best Drama Series ||  || rowspan = "2" | 
|-
| Best Leading Actress || Laia Costa || 
|}

References 

2019 Spanish television series debuts
2010s Spanish drama television series
Spanish comedy-drama television series
2010s Spanish comedy television series
2010s romance television series
Television shows filmed in Spain
Television shows filmed in Italy
Television shows filmed in France
Television shows set in Barcelona
HBO Europe original programming
Spanish-language television shows